Pennsylvania's 8th congressional district is located in the northeastern region of the state. It encompasses all of Wayne, Pike, and Lackawanna Counties; along with portions of Luzerne and Monroe counties. 

The district had been anchored in Bucks County from the 1940s until 2018, even as most other districts in Pennsylvania changed drastically during that time frame due to population shifts and Pennsylvania's loss of seats in the House.

The Supreme Court of Pennsylvania redrew the district in February 2018 after ruling the previous map unconstitutional due to gerrymandering. The 8th district was reassigned to the northeastern part of the state for the 2018 elections and representation thereafter. It is geographically the successor of the former 17th district, including the ancestrally Democratic cities of Scranton and Wilkes-Barre in the Wyoming Valley. Portions of the new 8th district also came from the old 10th district, including the more conservative counties of Pike and Wayne. Meanwhile, the Bucks County district was renumbered as the 1st district.

The district has a Cook PVI of R+5; however, the Democratic incumbent of the old 17th district, Matt Cartwright, won in 2018. At the time, it was one of seven districts that voted for Donald Trump in the 2020 presidential election while being held by a Democrat. Cartwright was reelected again in 2022, making it one of five Trump-won districts that voted for a Democrat in 2022.

District characteristics
The district is a mix of suburban and rural communities. It is predominantly white and middle class. The bulk of its population is located in the ancestrally Democratic cities of Scranton and Wilkes-Barre. However, the Democrats in this district are populist leaning, different from their counterparts in Philadelphia and Pittsburgh. The old 17th swung from a 55–43 win for Barack Obama to a 54–43 win for Donald Trump—the first time much of this area had voted for a Republican since 1988. Now this district is the second most Republican-leaning district held by a Democrat and the most Republican-leaning district held by a member of Congressional Progressive Caucus based on the Cook Partisan Voting Index.

Election results

List of members representing the district 

The district was created in 1791.

1791–1793: One seat

1795–1813: One seat

District restored in 1795.

1823–1833: Two seats

1833–present: One seat

See also

List of United States congressional districts
Pennsylvania's congressional districts

References

 
 
 Congressional Biographical Directory of the United States 1774–present

External links
 Congressional redistricting in Pennsylvania

08
Government of Bucks County, Pennsylvania
Government of Montgomery County, Pennsylvania
Constituencies established in 1791
1791 establishments in Pennsylvania
Constituencies disestablished in 1793
1793 disestablishments in Pennsylvania
Constituencies established in 1795
1795 establishments in Pennsylvania